Kristoffer Lawrence Cadevida (born on September 1, 1982), simply known as Kris Lawrence, is a Filipino-American singer-songwriter and occasional actor of dual American and Filipino citizenship.

Early life and career
Lawrence was born in Los Angeles, California, United States. His father is Loreto Cadevida and his mother is Justina Protacio.
His younger sister, Laurie Cadevida, played Kim, a Vietnamese woman on the North American Tour of Miss Saigon. Before he won Search for the Star in a Million, he was with Jay-R in the group First Impression from mid-1998 to early 2000.

In 2010, he signed an exclusive contract with GMA Network and appeared on the variety show Party Pilipinas. On March 12, 2012, Lawrence signed to GMA Records along with three other artists. Having already made GMA (the Kapuso Network) his home network since early 2010, and now officially joining their roster in music, Lawrence has hinted at his wish for his songs to be used in different shows on GMA.

Lawrence's self-titled debut album was released in 2006, followed by Moments of Love in 2009 which mainly included covers of songs such as George Michael's "Careless Whisper", Richard Marx's "Right Here Waiting" and Christopher Cross's "I Will Take You Forever". His third album, Spread the Love, was released in 2013 and his fourth album, Most Requested Playlist was released in 2015 under Universal Records.

Filmography

Television

Discography

Studio albums

Compilation albums

Singles
"Careless Whisper"
"When I See You Smile"
"Kung Malaya Lang Ako"
"Paano"
"Ikaw Pala"
"Sabihin Mo Naman"
"Isang Numero"
"Isang Saglit"
"Ako Nalang"
"Torpe"
"Anong Gusto Mo"
"Just Tell Me You Love Me"

Awards and nominations

Notes

References

External links
Official website
Kris Lawrence performs his version of "Careless Whisper"

1982 births
Living people
Filipino contemporary R&B singers
21st-century Filipino male singers
American musicians of Filipino descent
Filipino male models
Star Magic
Reality show winners
Participants in Philippine reality television series
Star Music artists
MCA Music Inc. (Philippines) artists
Universal Records (Philippines) artists
GMA Music artists
ABS-CBN personalities
GMA Network personalities